Zahida Abbasiyah (born 1279 – died 1328) was an Abbasid poet and philanthropist. Her full name was Zahida Bint Muhammad bin Mubarak bin Mostassam.

Born in Baghdad, she founded a school in the Emadiyah district of the city called the "Zahediya School"; poets and scholars gathered at her home to express their views. Zadeh married her cousin Emadeddin.

References

1279 births
1328 deaths